So Bright Is the View (Romanian: Atât de strălucitoare e vederea) is a 2014 Romanian film written and directed by twin brothers Joël and Michaël Florescu. It premiered as part of the Official Selection of the 36th Moscow International Film Festival.

Plot

Present day Bucharest. Estera is pursuing a job opportunity in Atlanta. She puts her hope in a "friend-interview" with Mike, a Romanian-American entrepreneur who reveals himself to be a domineering wreck with issues of his own.

Cast

 Bianca Valea as Estera
 Ovidiu Niculescu as Mike
 Robi Urs as Vlad
 Valentina Popa as Raluca
 Dana Apostol as Rivka
 Cristina Olteanu as Oana
 Dana Cucos as Luminita

Filmmakers

Joel Florescu and Michael Florescu, the writers and directors, are twin brothers of Franco-Romanian origin who began their cinematographic projects in Bucharest as part of the Romanian Independent Film Collective.

Reception

David Walsh  has dubbed So Bright Is the View "a serious film" and noted the film's "sociological significance", indicating the emergence of a new generation of filmmakers in Romania that critically addresses contemporary socioeconomic realities. Walsh praised the Florescu brothers' "obvious talent" and "ability to present the drama of everyday life", while critiquing the film's aesthetic "formalism".

Distribution

The film was acquired for distribution in North America by IndiePix Films.

References

External links
 

2014 films
Romanian drama films
2010s Romanian-language films